Fuji Athletic Stadium is an athletic stadium in Fuji, Shizuoka, Japan.

External links
city.fuji.shizuoka.jp

Football venues in Japan
Sports venues in Shizuoka Prefecture
Fuji, Shizuoka